Hardik Rathod (born 6 September 1988) is an Indian cricketer. He made his first-class debut for Saurashtra in the 2010–11 Ranji Trophy on 17 November 2010. He made his List A debut on 27 February 2014, for Railways in the 2013–14 Vijay Hazare Trophy.

References

External links
 

1988 births
Living people
Indian cricketers
Saurashtra cricketers
Railways cricketers
People from Rajkot